Mopti (established 2008 in Oslo, Norway) is a Norwegian experimental jazz band.

Band members 
Harald Lassen - saxophone
Kristoffer Eikrem - trumpet
David Aleksander Sjølie - guitar
Christian Meaas Svendsen - double bass
Andreas Wildhagen - drums

Honors 
2012: Awarded "This year's young jazz musicians" at Moldejazz

Discography 

2013: Logic (Ocean Sound Recordings)
2015: Bits & Pieces (Jazzland Recordings)

References

External links

Mopti at the Christian Meaas Svendsen website
And the winner is… Mopti at Festivalavisa FireFlate.no (in Norwegian)
Mopti & Bendik Baksaas live @ Moldejazz on YouTube

Norwegian jazz ensembles
Norwegian experimental musical groups
Musical groups established in 2011
Musical groups from Oslo
Jazzland Recordings (1997) artists
2011 establishments in Norway